North Grand Mall is a  shopping center serving the city of Ames, Iowa. In 2006, plans were announced for a $30 million renovation and expansion. In 2004, a farmers' market operated at the mall. The mall's anchor stores are Kohl's, Gap, Shoe Carnival, TJ Maxx, North Grand Cinema, Milroy's Tuxedos, rue21, Happy Nails, Verizon, Teikiatsu Judo, Aveda, Buckle, and JCPenney. There are 2 vacant anchor stores that were once DressBarn and Younkers. Sears announced its closure in late 2008. The Sears building was torn down, with Kohl's, TJ Maxx, and Shoe Carnival opening on its site.

In 2017, then-owners GK Development sold the mall to a trio of investors.

References

External links
North Grand Mall Official site

Shopping malls in Iowa
Shopping malls established in 1971
Buildings and structures in Ames, Iowa
Tourist attractions in Story County, Iowa